Reunion is an American drama television series that aired on Fox in late 2005. The series was intended to chronicle 20 years in the lives of a group of six high school friends from Bedford, New York, with each episode following one year in the lives of the six, beginning with their high school graduation year 1986. Each episode also featured scenes in the present where Detective Marjorino (Mathew St. Patrick) is investigating the brutal murder of one of the group during the night of their 20-year class reunion in 2006. The identity of the murder victim was not revealed until the fifth episode, "1990".

Due to low ratings, the series was canceled after only nine episodes (four more episodes had been ordered but were not aired in the US), and the identity of the killer remained unrevealed in the aired episodes.

Characters and plot
 Craig Brewster (Sean Faris): The spoiled son of real estate mogul Russell Brewster and future politician.
 Dr. Samantha Carlton (later Brewster) (Alexa Davalos): Craig's high school sweetheart and wife.
 Will Malloy (Will Estes): Craig's best friend, Sam's secret admirer, and the father of Sam's secret daughter Amy.  In early episodes, we learn that Will is a priest in the present time. After taking the rap for Craig for a DUI in 1986, Will goes to prison for manslaughter and was released in 1987 for good behavior, then worked for Craig's father in real estate before helping the FBI bring him down in 1989, later enlisting in the Army in 1990, shipping out to Kuwait as apart of the first Gulf War. After being discharged, he enrolls in law school.
 Aaron Lewis (Dave Annable): Slight geek who left MIT to sell technology and start an Internet company in its early days that blossomed into a multimillion-dollar company. His marriage to Pascal is compromised by his obvious lifelong affection for Carla.
 Carla Noll (later Holland) (Chyler Leigh): Aaron's best friend and hidden secret admirer for years, who entered into an abusive relationship with Amy's adopted father as Amy's nanny, and an aspiring photographer.
 Jenna Moretti (Amanda Righetti): The "hot girl" who enjoyed 15 minutes of fame in the late 1980s/early 1990s as an actress in Los Angeles before moving back to New York and attempting to get her life back on track.

Each episode also features scenes in the present where Detective Kenneth Marjorino (Mathew St. Patrick) is investigating the brutal murder of one of the group during the night of their 20-year class reunion, the identity of which was not revealed at the start of the season. Although his motives are initially secret, viewers quickly learn that Marjorino has harbored a 20-year grudge against Will Malloy, Craig Brewster, and their friends for what he perceives to be unfulfilled justice for the death of his father in a car accident that also involved a car occupied by Will and Craig (both of whom had been drinking that night). Although he maintains his composure, it becomes apparent that Marjorino is letting the case consume his life.

In each episode, viewers are introduced to additional minor characters who may or may not have significantly affected the past. These include Amy, the secret child of Will and Sam; Meghan Phillips, her adoptive mother; Paul Phillips, her adoptive father and future abusive lover of Carla; Peter, Carla's future husband; Pascal, Aaron's one-night stand and eventual wife; Chloe, their love child; Noelle, their second child; Henry, Sam and Craig's son; and Rachel, a former secretary of Craig Brewster with whom he had an affair early in his marriage to Sam and who resurfaces in an attempt to ruin both of their lives. The show was canceled prior to the addition of another significant minor character: Katherine Clark, the daughter of a rival Congressman of Craig Brewster and future fiancee of Will Malloy.

Other plotlines
 In "1988", viewers learn Marjorino's connection to the friends: his loving father was the driver who died in the car crash involving Will and Craig in 1986. Marjorino harbors intense feelings of injustice and largely believes that his father's killer has murdered the deceased friend. Originally vindictive towards Will, he soon turns his attention to Craig.
 In the fifth episode, "1990" (first aired November 10, 2005) it was revealed that Samantha is the character that was killed.
 In "1992", it was revealed that the present day Craig Brewster, who relies on a wheelchair for movement, is actually not paralyzed and can walk.
 In "1992", it was revealed that a younger Marjorino in fact plotted to kill Will Malloy for the murder of his father, only to be talked out of it by his future wife. In the present day, however, Marjorino's wife leaves him, disgusted that he cannot let go of revenge.
 In "1993", it was revealed that Peter, Carla's husband, died.
 The final aired episode, "1994", features a cliffhanger where Marjorino is run down by a car in an alley and left bloodied and injured. Leaked spoilers on the Internet have speculated that Craig and Sam's son Henry was the driver.
 A dark secret involving Craig and Will, in which Will took the heat for a drunk driving accident when Craig was actually driving the car, since his BAC was below the legal limit. The other man involved, Marjorino's father, died after being discharged, and Will spent a year in prison and lost his lacrosse scholarship after being made an example by the legal system.
 The love triangle between Craig, Sam, and Will, complicated by the child that only Sam knows was fathered by Will.
 The obvious love of Carla and Aaron, who can never be on the same page at the same time.
 Aaron's one night stand and the love child that resulted from it, leading to his marriage to her mother, Pascal.
 Carla becoming the nanny of Will and Sam's love child, Amy, to keep Sam in her life, and her ensuing relationship with Paul, Amy's adoptive father, that quickly turns abusive.
 Will being forced by the FBI to help bring down Russell Brewster for illegal practices, the same man who gave him a job to help rebuild his life after prison.
 Craig's entry into politics and winning a seat on the State Assembly.
 Jenna burning out in acting after ending her farce marriage to the gay producer who helped her build her career.
 The tension between Carla and her future husband Peter, and Aaron and his wife Pascal, over not only their devotion to their friends, but also their devotion to each other.
 Craig's affair with his mentally unstable secretary, Rachel.
 The mutual attraction between Jenna and Craig.
 Will Malloy serving in the army, entering law school, and eventually becoming Craig's campaign manager.
 Sam's addiction to stimulants.
 Sam's belief that she accidentally killed a woman because of the stimulants she was taking.
 Will's army friend's death and Will's affair with the friend's sister.
 In the last filmed episode (unseen in America) it was revealed that Sam and Will's daughter Amy had died in a fire with her adopted mother. If it were true, this would render it impossible for her to be the speculated killer.

Cancellation
Originally, Reunion was intended to last for 22 episodes, with each episode chronicling one year in the life of the six main characters—from their graduation in 1986 to the murder of one of them the day of their high school reunion in 2006. However, after a promising start, the show's ratings dropped, failing to hold the viewers from its lead in, The O.C., whereupon Fox announced the series would not be continued beyond the thirteen episodes already ordered.

While it was speculated the cancellation might lead to a change of the format—possibly skipping or combining some years to reach 2006 and reveal the murderer by the now-final thirteenth episode—series creator Jon Harmon Feldman originally announced the show would simply end with 1998, with the identity of the murderer unrevealed. However, after ratings continued to fall in December 2005, Fox announced – both in the media and on their official website – that the "1994" episode eventually would be the last, and the remaining four episodes filmed would not air. Fox later gave away outlines the episodes "1995", "1996", "1997" and "1998" to websites. On June 7, 2006, the episode "1998" was shown in many countries, but not the USA.

During the Television Critics Association press tour, Fox Entertainment president Peter Ligouri addressed reporters regarding the show's abrupt end.  Ligouri stated there were several ways to go with the killer's identity.  However, "the best guess was that particular time that it was going to be Sam's daughter", whom she gave up for adoption early in the series. The reason why the murder occurred still remains a mystery.

The Brazilian channel SBT, at the end of episode 13, inserted a narrator telling an alternative end (freely invented) for the drama: the killer would be Craig's father, Russell Brewster.

Unreleased plot
Sam was the one who ended up dying, so everybody was trying to cover their tracks. [The shooter] was supposed to be her daughter, who later down the road would have come to work for Carla. She [Carla] tries to get them reconciled, but someone breaks into the apartment of Craig Brewster, while Sam was there with her daughter. In a struggle with this intruder, Amy accidentally shot Sam.

When the 13th episode aired on the SBT channel in Brazil, additional information had been added. A narrator explained that an adult Amy, angry over being abandoned as an infant and being abused by her adopted father, accidentally shoots and kills Samantha. Will and Craig call Craig’s high-powered dad, Russell (Gregory Harrison), for help. The big twist is that, when Russell arrives, he discovers that Samantha is still breathing and secretly suffocates her because of Sam’s earlier affair with Will. His crime is eventually discovered and he’s brought to justice. Dave Annable verified the events of this ending in October 2006.

Episodes

References

External links
 
 Review of the Reunion pilot
 TV Series Finale article - Reunion killer revealed & unaired episodes plot details

2000s American drama television series
2005 American television series debuts
2005 American television series endings
English-language television shows
Television series set in the 1980s
Television series set in 1985
Television series set in 1986
Television series set in 1987
Television series set in 1988
Television series set in 1989
Television series set in the 1990s
Television series set in 1990
Television series set in 1991
Television series set in 1992
Television series set in 1993
Television series set in 1994
Television series set in 1995
Television series set in 1996
Television series set in 1997
Television series set in 1998
Television series set in 2006
Fox Broadcasting Company original programming
Television shows set in New York (state)
Serial drama television series
Television series by Warner Bros. Television Studios
Class reunions in popular culture